Daisy Elizabeth Mullan (born 29 November 2002) is an English cricketer who currently plays for Lancashire, Cumbria, North West Thunder and Manchester Originals. An all-rounder, she is a right-handed batter and right-arm medium bowler. She has previously played for North Representative XI.

Early life
Mullan was born on 29 November 2002, and is from Bolton, Greater Manchester. She has also played as a goalkeeper for Bury FC Women.

Domestic career
Mullan has played for Lancashire since Under-13 level, and captained the side at Under-17 level. She played her first matches for the team at senior level in 2020, appearing in two friendlies against Scotland without batting or bowling.

She made her competitive county debut in 2021, playing for North Representative XI in the Twenty20 Cup, a side made up of players from across the North of England. She took her first wicket and made her T20 high score on debut against Scotland A, making 31* to see her side to an 8 wicket victory. She played three matches for North Representative XI in the tournament before making two appearances for Lancashire, both against Cumbria, but made little impact. She played for Cumbria in the 2022 Women's Twenty20 Cup, scoring 56 runs and taking four wickets.

Mullan was also named as part of North West Thunder's squad for the 2020 Rachael Heyhoe Flint Trophy, but did not play a match for the side that season. She made her debut for the side in the 2021 Charlotte Edwards Cup against Western Storm, making 2 runs. She played a further three matches in the tournament, with a top score of 26. She also made her List A debut in the 2021 Rachael Heyhoe Flint Trophy. She played seven matches for North West Thunder in 2022, across the Charlotte Edwards Cup and the Rachael Heyhoe Flint Trophy, as well as playing one match for Manchester Originals in The Hundred. At the end of the 2022 season, it was announced that Mullan had signed her first professional contract with North West Thunder.

References

External links

Living people
2002 births
Cricketers from Bolton
Lancashire women cricketers
Cumbria women cricketers
North Representative XI cricketers
North West Thunder cricketers
Manchester Originals cricketers